Wałowice may refer to the following places:
Wałowice, Łódź Voivodeship (central Poland)
Wałowice, Lublin Voivodeship (east Poland)
Wałowice, Lubusz Voivodeship (west Poland)